"L.O.V.E. Got a Hold of Me" is a song by Greek singer Demis Roussos from his 1978 English-language album Demis Roussos.

The song was released as a 12" maxi single in 1978.

Background and writing 
The song was written by Dino Fekaris and Freddie Perren. Fekaris and Perren also produced the recording.

Commercial performance 
The song reached no. 26 on the Billboard disco chart on the week of July 22, 1978.

Track listing 
12" maxi single Mercury MK-51 (1978, US)
 A. "L.O.V.E. Got a Hold of Me" (10:01)
 B. "I Just Live" (7:07)

Charts

References

External links 

 Demis Roussos — "L.O.V.E. Got a Hold of Me" at Discogs

1978 songs
1978 singles
Demis Roussos songs
Mercury Records singles
Song recordings produced by Freddie Perren